Quercus polymorpha, the Mexican white oak, Monterrey oak or netleaf white oak, is a North American species of oak.

Description
Quercus polymorpha is a subevergreen tree up to 20 meters (67 feet) tall. The bark is gray or brown. The leaves are elliptical or egg-shaped, up to 15 centimetres (6 inches) long, unlobed or with a few shallow rounded lobes.

Range and habitat
Quercus polymorpha ranges across eastern and southern Mexico, in the Sierra Madre Oriental and Sierra Madre de Oaxaca ranges, the Chiapas Highlands of southeastern Mexico, and scattered locations on the Mexican Plateau, Trans-Mexican Volcanic Belt, and Sierra Madre Occidental. It is found in the states of Nuevo León, Tamaulipas, San Luis Potosí, Querétaro, Hidalgo, Veracruz, Puebla, Oaxaca, Chiapas, Coahuila, Guanajuato, Jalisco, Sinaloa, Michoacán, and Morelos. There is a single population in Val Verde County of southern Texas. There are scattered populations in the Guatemalan Highlands of central Guatemala, including Chiquimula, Huehuetenango, Jalapa, and Zacapa, and in western Honduras.

The species grows in a variety of habitats, including deep canyons in the Sierra Madre Oriental, riparian gallery forests, the margins of thorn scrub forest, tropical dry forests, the lower margins of montane oak–pine forests, and cloud forests. It is found from 400 to 2,100 meters elevation.

References

External links

 photo of herbarium specimen collected in Nuevo León in 1991
 Beat Springs Blossom, Nature Education includes photos
 : includes photos

polymorpha
Flora of Texas
Oaks of Mexico
Trees of Central America
Plants described in 1830
Flora of the Central American pine–oak forests
Flora of the Sierra Madre Oriental
Flora of the Sierra Madre de Oaxaca
Cloud forest flora of Mexico
Flora of the Chiapas Highlands